Helge Vonsyld (born 18 October 1947) is a Danish former footballer who played as a defender. He played in ten matches for the Denmark national team from 1973 to 1974, competing in the men's tournament at the 1972 Summer Olympics.

References

External links
 

1947 births
Living people
People from Randers
Danish men's footballers
Association football defenders
Denmark international footballers
Olympic footballers of Denmark
Footballers at the 1972 Summer Olympics
Randers FC players
Sportspeople from the Central Denmark Region